Nigel Geoffrey Jones (born 22 April 1982) is a New Zealand-born Irish cricketer. Jones is a right-handed batsman who bowls right-arm medium pace. Jones plays international cricket for Ireland. He was born in Timaru, New Zealand.

Jones made his List-A debut for Ireland against Jamaica on their tour of the West Indies in 2010. He made his Twenty20 debut when Ireland played Sri Lanka A in the 2010 Quadrangular Twenty20 Series in Sri Lanka. Jones made his Twenty20 International debut when Ireland played Afghanistan in the final of the 2010 ICC World Twenty20 Qualifier. This is his only Twenty20 International to date.

Jones was a member of Ireland's 2010 ICC World Cricket League Division One winning team. During the tournament, he made his One Day International debut which came against Kenya. He played 6 further One Day International's during the tournament. During the tour, he played a further 2 Twenty20's against a West Indies XI. A member of Ireland's squad for the 2010 ICC World Twenty20, Jones did not feature in any of Ireland's matches during the tournament. He was also selected in Ireland's 15-man squad for the 2011 World Cup, but did not play in the tournament. In January 2012 Cricket Ireland increased the number of player contracts to 23 across three categories, and Jones was given a category C contract.

References

External links
 

1982 births
Living people
Cricketers from Timaru
Irish cricketers
Ireland Twenty20 International cricketers
Ireland One Day International cricketers
Irish people of New Zealand descent
Cricketers at the 2011 Cricket World Cup
Northern Knights cricketers